is a Japanese manga series written by Nisio Isin and illustrated by Akira Akatsuki. The series follows Medaka Kurokami, Zenkichi Hitoyoshi, Kouki Akune and Mogana Kikaijima, who are the members of the student council, during their various adventures to honor suggestions presented by academy members in order to better the academy. Medaka Box was serialized in Shueisha's shōnen manga magazine Weekly Shōnen Jump between May 2009 and April 2013, with its chapters collected in twenty-two tankōbon volumes.

It received three light novel series, two series with two volumes and one with one volume between 2012 and 2013. It was adapted into a 12-episode anime television series that aired between April and June 2012. A second 12-episode season aired between October and December 2012.

Plot

The plot follows Medaka Kurokami, a charismatic and attractive first-year Hakoniwa Academy student who is elected Student Council President with 98% of the vote. She institutes a suggestion box, and with the help with her childhood friend Zenkichi Hitoyoshi, addresses these requests in an unconventional manner. Over the course of the story, she distributes the student council leadership positions to other students such as Kouki Akune and Mogana Kikaijima.

The Student Council learns that the academy chairman intends to initiate the Flask Plan, a project to forcefully experiment on regular students, called Normals, in order to turn them into humans with superhuman abilities called Abnormals. The Student Council infiltrates the academy's secret lab and battles other students that are involved with the project.

Shortly after, the Student Council are challenged to a tournament by Misogi Kumagawa who wishes to replace Medaka's Student Council with one of his own. After Kumagawa's defeat, two students are unsealed from his powers and complete their transfer to Hakoniwa Academy. The two are more powerful than Abnormals and are dubbed "Not Equals". Their leader, Anshin'in, threatens to restart the Flask Plan once Medaka graduates, forcing the Student Council to train their successors. However, Anshin'in's true plan is to have Zenkichi usurp Medaka's position as Student Council President. Zenkichi does so on the pretense of improving the student life and succeeds. He convinces Medaka to allow the Flask Plan for those who are willing.

Relieved from her duties as president of the Student Council, Medaka soon becomes involved in a tournament to decide her husband. Medaka enters herself and becomes the victor, choosing to marry Zenkichi once they both graduate. Soon after, Zenkichi's close friend Hansode Shiranui leaves the academy. Medaka and Zenkichi discover she is to become the next host for Iihiko Shishime, a 5000-year-old being. Medaka defeats him and disappears after stopping the moon from crashing towards the Earth, just to reappear in time for the year-end ceremony. Following her return, Medaka decides to leave the academy and assume her father's place ahead of her family's business conglomerate, the Kurokami Group, just to later return as the new chairwoman. Ten years later, Zenkichi, has worked his way up the Kurokami Group, becoming a high-level employee before reuniting with her, with both promising to get married after another fight.

Media

Manga

Medaka Box is written by Nisio Isin and illustrated by Akira Akatsuki. It was serialized in Shueisha's shōnen manga magazine Weekly Shōnen Jump between May 11, 2009, and April 27, 2013. Shueisha collected its 192 individual chapters in twenty-two tankōbon volumes, released from October 2, 2009, to September 4, 2013.

Anime

An anime adaptation of the manga produced by Gainax was announced by the series' creator in late 2011, and premiered on April 5, 2012. The anime has been licensed by Sentai Filmworks, who released the anime in both digital and home video formats in September 2013. A second season, titled , aired between October 11 and December 27, 2012. Sentai Filmworks has also licensed the second season for digital and home video, which was released on January 21, 2014.

Light novel
In May 2012, a spin-off light novel called Shousetsu Ban Medaka Box was released by Shueisha under the imprint Jump J-Books with Nisio Isin as the author and Akira Akatsuki as the illustrator, with the novel ending in June of the same year with two volumes. In October 2012 under the same publisher, imprint and creative team, a prequel called Medaka Box Gaiden: Good Loser Kumagawa was launched, with the second and last volume launching in November. Lastly, another prequel called Medaka Box: Juvenile - Shousetsu-ban launched with the same publisher, imprint and creative team in October 2013 but this time with a unique volume.

Video game
Medaka Kurokami appears as a playable character in the Jump crossover fighting game J-Stars Victory VS, with Kumagawa appearing as a support character.

Reception
As of 2013, the series has reached a total of 5 million copies sold.

References

External links
  

 Official Shueisha Preview Site 
  
 

Nisio Isin
2012 anime television series debuts
Action anime and manga
Anime series based on manga
Bandai Namco franchises
Comedy anime and manga
Gainax
Jump J-Books
School life in anime and manga
Sentai Filmworks
Shōnen manga
Shueisha franchises
Shueisha manga
Supernatural anime and manga
TV Tokyo original programming
Metafictional comics